Mount Cabrebald is a mountain located within the Barrington Tops National Park, in the Upper Hunter region of New South Wales, Australia.

Noted for the (previously) grass covered summit in a heavily forested area. Also for the  Grass Tree forest, the tall eucalyptus forest and rainforest in fire free areas. The 360 degree views from the summit are considered some of the finest in this World Heritage region. Other plants found on the mountain include New England Blackbutt, Australian Red Cedar and Giant Stinging Tree.

Gallery

See also 

 List of mountains in New South Wales

References

Cabrebald
Gondwana Rainforests of Australia